Clara Benin (born February 19, 1994) is a Filipina indie singer-songwriter best known for her track "Parallel Universe". As of October 2019, Benin has amassed tens of millions of streams in Spotify.

Personal life
Clara Benin is the eldest daughter of former Side A member Joey Benin. She has three other siblings, Boey, Jaco, and Sarah who are also inclined to music.

Career
In 2012, Benin enrolled in MINT College to study Music Business Management, where she released a video of her original composition “Closure”.

2013: Elements National Music Camp
In 2013, she was accepted, in the same batch with fellow artists Reese and Vica and Sitti, into the Philippines' Elements National Music Camp. Here she was mentored by Ryan Cayabyab, Joey Ayala and Noel Cabangon.

2014: Philippine Popular Music Festival
In 2014, she performed for the McDonald's jingle "Hooray for Today". She then participated with Mcoy Fundales at the third Philippine Popular Music Festival to interpret the song entry “Kung Akin Ang Langit”, written by Chi Datu-Bocobo and Isaac Joseph Garcia. The song won the Spinnr People’s Choice Award.

Benin wrote and recorded the theme song ("Araw't Gabi") for the independent film Red.

2015–present: Breakthrough
Her debut album "Human Eyes" was released on 7 March 2015 at 26th St. Bistro in BGC.

Debut album: Human Eyes
"Human Eyes" was recorded in three months at the Sonic Boom studio at MINT College and at Loudbox Studios.  The album is self-produced, with the help of her father Joey Benin, indie music impresario Alex Lim, and studio producer/engineer Angee Rozul for mixing and mastering.

First EP: Riverchild
In November 2015, Benin released the EP titled Riverchild that she produced, wrote, and mixed.

The "Riverchild" EP is part of an advocacy campaign for bringing children to school. Proceeds will go to the Tapulanga Foundation, a non-profit charitable organization working to uplift the lives of those who were born with less through educational scholarships and healthcare assistance.

2019: Zandari Festa and Coke Studio Philippines
Benin performed in the 2019 edition of Zandari Festa, an annual three-day music festival held in Seoul, South Korea.

It was announced that Benin will be participating in the third season of Coke Studio Philippines, an annual music television program in the Philippines featuring performances by various Filipino music artists.

Discography

Albums
 Human Eyes (2015)

EPs
 Riverchild (2015)
 I Rose Up Slowly (2019)
 Fragments (2020)

Accolades

References 

1994 births
Living people
Filipino singer-songwriters
Place of birth missing (living people)
21st-century Filipino women singers